The 2013 National Lacrosse League season, the 27th in the history of the NLL, began on January 5, 2013 and ended with the Championship game on May 11, 2013. The Rochester Knighthawks overcame a mediocre 8-8 season to get hot in the playoffs for the second straight year, defeating the Philadelphia Wings, Minnesota Swarm, and Washington Stealth to win their second straight Championship. The Knighthawks became the first team to repeat as NLL Champions since the 2002-2003 Toronto Rock.

2013 featured a very close regular season, as the top and bottom teams were only separated by 4 games (the 10-6 Toronto Rock vs. 6-10 Buffalo Bandits). The final playoff spot was up for grabs right up until the final weekend of the season. In the end, the Bandits were the lone team out of the playoffs, missed the post-season for the first time since 2002.

Final standings

Playoffs

•Final played at Langley Events Centre due to arena conflict in Washington.

NOTE: In 2013, the NLL added a crossover rule to the playoff format:

"Eight teams shall earn playoff berths. There is also a crossover allowed which will allow the 5th place team in the West Division to take the place of the 4th place team in the East Division if the 5th place team has a better record. Each division champion faces the fourth place finisher from their division (or the crossover team should that team qualify for the playoffs). The second place finisher in each division faces the third place finisher from their division in the Division Semifinals. Each game is hosted by the higher-seeded team."

With a record of 7-9, the Minnesota Swarm was the 5th place West Division team.  With a record of 6-10, the Buffalo Bandits were the 4th place East Division team.  Since Minnesota had a better record than Buffalo, the crossover rule went into effect with Minnesota replacing Buffalo and playing as the 4th place team in the East Division playoffs.

Milestones and events

Pre-season
 August 13, 2012: The league announced that the 2012 entry draft would be held in Toronto on October 1. There would also be a player combine the day before the draft at the new Toronto Rock practice facility in Oakville, Ontario.
 October 2, 2012: Former NLL goaltender and current Buffalo Bandits GM Steve Dietrich was inducted into the National Lacrosse League Hall of Fame in a ceremony in Toronto.
 December 8, 2012: The Calgary Roughnecks defeated the Colorado Mammoth 20-11 in a pre-season game at the Langley Events Centre in Langley, British Columbia. This was the second pre-season game at the LEC, as the Toronto Rock and Washington Stealth played there in 2012.
 December 14, 2012: The National Lacrosse League returned to Montreal as the Toronto Rock defeated the Rochester Knighthawks 14-10 at the Bell Centre in front of 7,269 fans.
 December 14, 2012: In a blockbuster trade, NLL superstar Dan Dawson was traded to the Rochester Knighthawks along with his brother Paul Dawson and a first-round draft pick in 2016 for Paul Rabil, Jordan Hall, Joel White, Robbie Campbell, and a second round draft pick in 2014.
 December 20, 2012: Kaleb Toth, the longest-serving member of the Calgary Roughnecks, announced his retirement from the NLL.

Regular season
 January 22, 2013: Buffalo Bandits forward Shawn Williams continued his record-setting consecutive game streak, playing in his 200th consecutive NLL game.
 February 15, 2013: The rare "sock-trick" was accomplished twice on the same night, as Edmonton Rush rookie Mark Matthews and Toronto Rock forward Garrett Billings scored six goals each to lead their teams to victory.
 February 25, 2013: Minnesota Swarm captain Andrew Suitor suffered a knee injury in a game against the Edmonton Rush, ending his 2013 season.
 March 12, 2013: Former league MVP Casey Powell was traded by the Rochester Knighthawks to the Colorado Mammoth in exchange for Jon Sullivan and a 3rd round draft pick in 2014.
 March 14, 2013: Buffalo Bandits GM and retired goaltender Steve Dietrich traded a 6th round draft pick to the Toronto Rock for his own playing rights.
 March 15, 2013: The league announced that the regular season schedule would be expanded to 18 games for the 2014 NLL season. The league had been playing a 16-game schedule since 2002.

Playoffs
 May 11, 2013: Despite having earned the right to host the Championship game, the Washington Stealth were forced to play the game in a neutral site arena because of schedule conflicts with Comcast Arena. The game was played at the Langley Events Centre in Langley, British Columbia.

Awards

All-Rookie team
 Joey Cupido, Colorado
 Shayne Jackson, Minnesota
 Curtis Knight, Edmonton
 Mark Matthews, Edmonton
 Kiel Matisz, Minnesota
 Joe Resetarits, Calgary
 Dhane Smith, Buffalo

All-Pro teams
First team
 Garrett Billings, Toronto
 Rhys Duch, Washington
 Shawn Evans, Calgary
 Jordan MacIntosh, Minnesota
 Kyle Rubisch, Edmonton
 Matt Vinc, Rochester

Second team
 Callum Crawford, Minnesota 
 Curtis Dickson, Calgary 
 John Grant, Jr., Colorado 
 Jesse Gamble, Toronto 
 Mike Grimes, Washington 
 Brandon Miller, Philadelphia

Weekly awards
The NLL gives out awards weekly for the best offensive player, best transition player, best defensive player, and best rookie.

Monthly awards 
Awards are also given out monthly for the best overall player and best rookie.

Statistics leaders
Bold numbers indicate new single-season records. Italics indicate tied single-season records.

See also
 2013 in sports

References

13
National Lacrosse League